Edward Bamber (alias Reading) (b. c. 1600, at the Moor, Poulton-le-Fylde, Lancashire; executed at Lancaster 7 August 1646) was an English Roman Catholic priest. He was beatified in 1987.

Life
Educated at the English College, Valladolid, he was ordained and sent to England. On landing at Dover, he knelt down to thank God. Seen doing this by the Governor of Dover Castle, he was arrested and banished.

He returned again, and was soon afterwards apprehended near Standish, Lancashire; he had probably been chaplain at Standish Hall. On his way to Lancaster Castle he was lodged at the Old-Green-Man Inn near Claughton-on-Brock, and managed to escape, his keepers being drunk. He was found wandering in the fields by a Mr. Singleton of Broughton Tower and was sheltered by him.

Arrested the third time, he was committed to Lancaster Castle, where he remained in close confinement for three years, once escaping, but recaptured. At his trial with two other priests, Thomas Whitaker and John Woodcock, two apostates witnessed against him that he had administered the sacraments, and he was condemned to die.

A stained glass window in the church of St.Marie's in Standish depicts the Ven. Edward being pushed off a ladder, which served as a gallows for his execution, by two soldiers.

An ode composed on his death is still extant.

See also
 Catholic Church in the United Kingdom
 Douai Martyrs
 Eighty-five martyrs of England and Wales

References

Attribution
 The entry cites:
Richard Challoner, Memoirs (1750)
William Watson, Decacordon of ten Quodlibet Questions (1602)
Joseph Gillow, Bibl. Dict. Eng. Cath. (London, 1885)

1646 deaths
16th-century English Roman Catholic priests
English beatified people
17th-century venerated Christians
English College, Valladolid alumni
Year of birth unknown
Eighty-five martyrs of England and Wales
17th-century English Roman Catholic priests
17th-century Roman Catholic martyrs
People from Poulton-le-Fylde